Petrache Lupu (born 14 October 1907, Maglavit, Dolj, Romania - died December 14, 1994, Maglavit, Dolj, Romania) was a shepherd from Maglavit commune, who claimed to have had divine visions. In 1935 a mass phenomenon began, with Maglavit becoming a Christian pilgrimage place for crowds of people. The Maglavit Monastery is built in the area.

Lupu stated that he saw God hovering above the earth, who urged him to tell others to repent, honour the Lord's Day, as well as fast on Wednesdays and Fridays. Lupu erected a Christian cross where the apparition took place; it soon became a place of Christian pilgrimage, with the fountain water being said to be miraculous.

References

External links
 Minune sau șarlatanie la Maglavit?, 28 October 2012, Adevărul - articol Historia

Clairvoyants
Members of the Romanian Orthodox Church
1907 births
1994 deaths